The 2019 F4 Japanese Championship season was the fifth season of the F4 Japanese Championship. It began on 13 April in Okayama and finished on 3 November in Twin Ring Motegi after seven double header rounds.

Teams and drivers
All teams were Japanese-registered

Race calendar and results
All rounds will be held in Japan. The "2019 FIA Formula 1 World Championship Round 17 Japan Grand Prix Race" will be held at Suzuka Circuit on October 11-13, 2019 first time as a support race event. This "FIA-F4 Dream Cup Race" (tentative name) will be a special non-points race. 

Other rounds supporting of the Super GT events.

Championship standings

Points were awarded as follows:

Drivers' standings

Independent Cup

Teams' standings

References

External links
  

Japanese F4 Championship seasons
Japanese
F4 Japanese Championship
Japan Formula 4